Kevin Lerena (born 5 May 1992) is a South African professional boxer who held the IBO cruiserweight title from 2017 to 2021 and challenged for the WBA (Regular) heavyweight title in 2022. As of September 2021, he is ranked as the world's fifth best active cruiserweight by The Ring magazine, fourth by Transnational Boxing Rankings Board and eight by BoxRec.

Boxing career

Early career
Lerena made his professional debut against Justice Siliga on November 30, 2011, and won the fight by a second-round knockout. He amassed a 12-1 during the next four years, before challenging Deon Coetzee for the South African cruiserweight title. He beat Coetzee by unanimous decision. He made his first and only title defense against Johnny Muller on April 24, 2016. He won the fight by a tenth-round technical knockout.

Lerena was scheduled to face the one-time WBA World light heavyweight title challenger Roberto Bolonti on June 11, 2016. He won the fight by unanimous decision, with scores of 97-93, 97-93 and 96-94.

Lerena was scheduled to face the undefeated Micki Nielsen on October 22, 2016. He won the fight by majority decision. Two judges scored the bout 96-95 and 97-93 in his favor, while the third judge scored it as a 95-95 draw.

Lerena was scheduled to fight Vikapita Meroro on February 4, 2017. He won the fight by a fifth-round technical knockout. Meroro appeared to go down easy, while led fight promoter Rodney Berman to withhold his purse and state: "He quit, plain and simple".

Lerena was scheduled to face Sergio Ramirez on April 23, 2017. He won the fight by unanimous decision, after the eight scheduled rounds were contested. It was the first time in three years that Lerena was scheduled to fight less than ten rounds.

IBO Cruiserweight champion
Lerena was scheduled to face Maxim Maslov for the vacant IBO cruiserweight title on August 12, 2017, at the Emperors Palace in Kempton Park, South Africa. On July 25, Maslov announced his withdrawal from the bout due to a recurring injury. He was replaced by the former WBC Continental cruiserweight champion Olanrewaju Durodola. Durodola later withdrew from the bout as well, and was replaced by the former interim WBA Cruiserweight titlist Youri Kalenga. As Kalenga stepped in on ten days notice, the fight itself was postponed for September 9, 2017. Lerena won the fight by split decision, with two judges awarding him 116-113 and 115-113 scorecards, while the third judge scored it 117-111 for Kalenga. Kalenga threw a great volume of hooks and power punches in the early rounds, which were awarded to him on all three of the judges cards. Lerena was able to rally in the mid rounds however, and did enough to edge the fight in his favor.

Lerena made the first defense of his IBO title against the #13 ranked WBC cruiserweight contender Dmytro Kucher. The bout was scheduled as the headliner of the Emperors Palace fight card, which was held on March 3, 2018. Fight promoter Golden Gloves announced that the winner of the title fight would face Roman Golovashchenko just six weeks later. Lerena won the fight by a wide unanimous decision, with two judges awarding him eleven of the twelve contested rounds, while the third judge scored the fight 117-111 for Lerena.

True to their word, promoter Golden Gloves scheduled Lerena to face Roman Golovashchenko in his second IBO cruierserweight title defense. Lerena entered the bout as the #6 ranked WBC and #4 ranked IBF contender, while Golovashchenko wasn't at the time highly regarded by any of the four major boxing governing bodies. He won the fight by unanimous decision, with scores of 116-111, 115-112 and 115-112. Lerena scored the sole knockdown of the fight in the fifth round, dropping Golovashchenko with a left hand, although he was unable to finish his opponent.

In 2018 he tested positive for a banned substance by the Voluntary Anti-Doping Association. He was cleared of any wrongdoing by the IBO on February 2, 2019.

Lerena made the third defense of his IBO title against the undefeated Artur ‘Thunder’ Mann. The fight was scheduled for March 16, 2019, to be contested at the Emperors Palace in Kempton Park, South Africa. Lerena won the fight by a fourth-round technical knockout. He first knocked Mann down twice in the second round, with an uppercut and a flurry of punches. Mann was able to survive the third round, but was stopped by another flurry of punches in the fourth round, with 23 seconds left.

Lerena was scheduled to make his fourth IBO title defense against Vasil Ducar on June 8, 2019. As Ducar was vastly less experienced with only nine fights up to that point, and as he hadn't faced the same level of competition as Lerena, he came into the fight as a significant underdog. Lerena won the fight by a wide unanimous decision, with scores of 120-108, 119-109 and 117-111.

Lerena was scheduled to make his fifth IBO title defense against Sefer Seferi on September 21, 2019, at the Emperors Palace in Kempton Park, South Africa. The 40-year old Seferi came into the fight as the #30 ranked IBO cruiserweight contender, and was seen as a large underdog. Lerena won the fight by a third-round technical knockout. He landed a left hook to the body, followed by a left hook to the head, which floored Seferi. As Seferi was unable to rise from the canvas, referee Jean Robert Laine decided to stop the fight.

Lerena made his sixth IBO title defense against the two-time WBO title challenger Firat Arslan on February 8, 2020, at the EWS Arena in Göppingen, Germany. He beat the 49-year old by a sixth-round technical knockout. Lerena staggered his opponent with a left hook, and landed a number of unanswered punches, which forced Arslan's corner to throw in the towel.

Move to heavyweight
Lerena was scheduled to face Patrick Ferguson in a non-title, heavyweight bout on December 19, 2020, at the Emperors Palace in Kempton Park, South Africa. The bout, as well as the entire card that it headlined, was broadcast on UFC Fight Pass. Lerena won the fight by a fifth-round technical knockout.

Lerena faced Bogdan Dinu for the vacant WBA Inter-Continental heavyweight title on March 26, 2022. Lerena captured his first heavyweight title with a fourth-round knockout of Dinu. 

Lerena is scheduled to face the one-time unified heavyweight title challenger Mariusz Wach on September 17, 2022, at the Emperors Palace in Kempton Park, South Africa. He won the fight by unanimous decision, with scores of 120–108, 120–108, and 118–110.

Lerena challenged Daniel Dubois for the WBA (Regular) heavyweight title on Dec 3, 2022 at the Tottenham Hotspur Stadium in London, England. He lost the fight by a third-round technical knockout, despite knocking Dubois down three times in the first round.

Professional boxing record

References

External links
 

1992 births
Living people
South African male boxers
Cruiserweight boxers
Southpaw boxers
Boxers from Johannesburg
White South African people